Dimitrovsky is a rural locality (a settlement) in Kolenovskoye Rural Settlement, Novokhopyorsky District, Voronezh Oblast, Russia. The population was 82 as of 2010.

Geography 
Dimitrovsky is located 43 km west of Novokhopyorsk (the district's administrative centre) by road. Yelan-Kolenovsky is the nearest rural locality.

References 

Populated places in Novokhopyorsky District